Sergei Sergeyevich Alexeyev (28 July 1924 – 12 May 2013) was a Soviet and Russian legal scholar and politician. He was the first and only chairman of the Committee for Constitutional Supervision of the USSR from 1990 to 1991. Later, he was one of the co-authors of the Constitution of Russia of 1993, along with Anatoly Sobchak and Sergey Shakhray.

Death 
On 12 May 2013 Alexeyev died of a heart attack.

References 

1924 births
2013 deaths
Soviet jurists
Russian jurists
Jurisprudence academics
Russian politicians
Members of the Congress of People's Deputies of the Soviet Union
Corresponding Members of the USSR Academy of Sciences
Corresponding Members of the Russian Academy of Sciences
Recipients of the Order "For Merit to the Fatherland", 3rd class
Recipients of the Order of Friendship of Peoples
Recipients of the USSR State Prize
Demidov Prize laureates
Russian legal scholars
Philosophers of law
Ural State Law University alumni